Dictyonema huaorani is a species of basidiolichen in the family Hygrophoraceae. It was first described in 2014.

See also
Psilocybin
Dimethyltryptamine
5-MeO-DMT

References

huaorani
Lichen species
Lichens described in 2014
Basidiolichens
Taxa named by Robert Lücking
Taxa named by James D. Lawrey